American Dreamer is an American sitcom television series created by Susan Seeger, which aired on NBC from September 20, 1990, until June 22, 1991, as part of its 1990-91 lineup.

American Dreamer stars Robert Urich as fictional character Tom Nash, formerly a high-powered network correspondent who was forced to reassess his priorities following the death of his wife. He decided to give up his career in order to spend more time with his children. To do this, he moved to Kenosha, Wisconsin, where he supported his family by contributing a column about "real people" to a Chicago newspaper. His editor, Joe Baines (Jeffrey Tambor), felt Tom was completely wasting his talents and drove out from Chicago weekly (a huge sacrifice, from his viewpoint) to attempt to convince Tom to return the world of "hard news". Other characters included Tom's zany secretary, Lillian Abernathy (Carol Kane), and a friendly waitress at Tom's favorite local diner, Holly Baker (Margaret Welsh).

This program was considered low-key. Tom sometimes "broke the fourth wall" to address the viewers directly about his thoughts regarding the situations he encountered. This philosophizing gained only a small audience and the program was cancelled at midseason, although selected episodes were rerun the following summer.

It is not related to the film of the same name.

Cast
Robert Urich as Tom Nash
Margaret Welsh as Holly Baker 
Jeffrey Tambor as Joe Baines
Carol Kane as Lillian Abernathy
Chay Lentin as Rachel Nash 
Johnny Galecki as Danny Nash

Episodes

References

Brooks, Tim and Marsh, Earle, The Complete Directory to Prime Time Network and Cable TV Shows

External links

NBC original programming
1990s American sitcoms
1990 American television series debuts
1991 American television series endings
Television series by CBS Studios
Television shows set in Wisconsin